Richard Arthur may refer to:

 Richard Arthur (bishop) (1560–1646), Irish religious figure
 Richard Arthur (Australian politician) (1865–1932), Australian politician
 Richard Arthur (British politician), British politician

See also
 Arthur (surname)